William Stevens House, also known as Peach Mansion, is a historic home located at Kenton, Kent County, Delaware.  The house was erected about 1860, and is a three-story, five bay, single pile frame dwelling in the Italianate style. It has a low hipped roof and a projecting box cornice with decorative brackets.  The original house, built about 1811, forms the gable-roofed, three-bay, two-story, rear wing.  Also on the property is a contributing 19th century springhouse.

It was listed on the National Register of Historic Places in 1983. It was demolished in a controlled burn in February 2001.

References

Houses on the National Register of Historic Places in Delaware
Italianate architecture in Delaware
Houses completed in 1860
Houses in Kent County, Delaware
Kenton, Delaware
National Register of Historic Places in Kent County, Delaware